Gregoria (Greek: Γρηγορία, fl. 641) was the Byzantine empress as the wife of Constantine III. She participated in the minority regency government of her son, Constans II, in 641–650.

Life 
She was a daughter of Niketas, a first cousin of Heraclius who had led an overland invasion of Roman Egypt in 608 in the revolt which elevated Heraclius to the throne.
Niketas fought against the representatives of Phocas in Egypt and seems to have secured control of the province by 610.

On 5 October 610, Heraclius succeeded Phocas as the emperor. Niketas was rewarded with the social rank of patrician and the military position of Comes Excubitorum, commander of the Excubitors. He seems to have remained in control of Egypt and took part in the defense against the invasion of Khosrau II of the Sassanid Empire. Egypt was lost to Khosrau in 618 but Niketas survived. Niketas was then appointed Exarch of the Exarchate of Africa. His term started in 619 and lasted to his death in 628/629.

Her paternal grandfather was Gregorius, brother to Heraclius the Elder. Heraclius had been appointed Exarch of Africa by Maurice and lived to support the revolt of his son. But not to its conclusion. Gregorius seems to have served under the command of his brother but the extent of his role is unknown.

Empress 

Gregoria was betrothed to her second cousin Constantine III, only known son of Heraclius and his first wife Eudokia. Constantine was crowned co-emperor by his father on 22 January 613.

Their marriage took place in 629/630. The groom was about seventeen years old. Gregoria was likely of equivalent age. She had arrived to Constantinople from the Western Pentapolis in Cyrenaica. Since Cyrenaica was in the territory of her father Niketas, Gregoria is assumed to have been brought up under his supervision instead of that of her father-in-law.  She was the junior Empress with Martina as the senior one.

Gregoria and her husband had at least two sons. Constans II was born on 7 November 630. According to Theophanes, a second son was named Theodosius. He was executed by Constans in 659/660. A genealogical theory also adds a daughter to the list of children. The daughter is given as Manyanh, a purported granddaughter of Heraclius and wife of Yazdgerd III.

Heraclius died on 11 February 641. Constantine III became senior emperor with his paternal half-brother Heraklonas as his co-ruler. Constantine died of tuberculosis between April and May of the same year. A revolt in favor of Constans resulted in the deposition of Heraklonas by September. Her son was a minor until 650, and Gregoria was most likely regent during his minority, but her acts as regent is not mentioned in Byzantine sources.

References

External links 
The pages of "Heraclius" dealing with Niketas and Egypt
The page of "The Prosopography of the Later Roman Empire", vol. 2 dealing with Heraclius of Edessa

7th-century births
7th-century deaths
Heraclian dynasty
7th-century Byzantine empresses
7th-century women rulers
Mothers of Byzantine emperors